Christ on the Cross with Mary and St John is a c.1443-1445 altarpiece by Rogier van der Weyden, now in the Kunsthistorisches Museum in Vienna. The central scene shows the Crucifixion of Jesus, with the Virgin Mary clinging to the foot of the cross, John the Evangelist comforting her and the painting's two donors kneeling to the right. On the left hand side panel is Mary Magdalene, whilst on the right side panel is St Veronica. A unified landscape background across all three panels shows Jerusalem in the distance.

References

Paintings by Rogier van der Weyden
1445 paintings
van der Weyden
Paintings of the Virgin Mary
Paintings depicting John the Apostle
Paintings depicting Mary Magdalene
Paintings in the collection of the Kunsthistorisches Museum